Marina Ried ( Rsjevskaja; 1921–1989) was a Russian-born German stage and film actress. The niece of the film star Olga Chekhova, she was born in Moscow but moved to Germany as a child. She was married to actor Rudolf Platte between 1942 and 1953.

Filmography

References

Bibliography
 Peter Cowie & Derek Elley. World Filmography: 1967. Fairleigh Dickinson University Press, 1977.

External links

1921 births
1989 deaths
Soviet emigrants to Germany
German television actresses
German stage actresses
German film actresses